Scarlet paintbrush is a common name for several flowering plants and may refer to:

Castilleja coccinea
Castilleja indivisa
Castilleja miniata, native to western North America